The 1935 Turkish Football Championship was the sixth edition of the competition. Fenerbahçe won their second national championship title by defeating Altınordu 3–1 in the final. For Altınordu it was the club's third and last appearance in the championship final.

The various regional champions competed in a group stage of five groups of three to six teams each, with the group winners qualifying for the final stage.

Group stage

Adana Group

Round 1

Group final

 Adana Torosspor won the group and qualified for the final stage.

Aydın Group

Round 1

Semi-final

 1 Uşak Gençlerbirliği won 1–0, though the result was declared void since Uşak fielded an irregular player. Sakarya were awarded the win.
 Altınordu received a bye for the group final.

Group final

 Altınordu won the group and qualified for the final stage.

Balıkesir Group

Round 1

 Balıkesir Spor Yurdu received a bye for the semi-final.

Semi-final

 Fenerbahçe received a bye for the group final.

Group final

 Fenerbahçe won the group and qualified for the final stage.

Eskişehir Group

Round 1

Group final

 1 Match could not be finished due to darkness. Replay was played on 28 August.

Trabzon Group

Round 1

Group final

 Samsun SK won the group and qualified for the final stage.

Final stage

Round 1

 Samsun SK received a bye for the semi-final.

Semi-final

 Fenerbahçe received a bye for the final.

Final

References

External links
RSSSF

Turkish Football Championship seasons
Turkish
Turkey